1000 Hurts is the third studio album by American indie rock band Shellac, released on August 8, 2000. In its official promotional materials Shellac jokingly described this album as follows: "There are no 12-minute songs on this one. This record is more mean-spirited. Todd sings."

The cover is a clear homage to old Ampex audio recording tape boxes. The band are known for using analog tape for their recordings, and are fans of Ampex tape and tape recorders. Also, the speech at the start of the record is a variation on the announcements one would hear on Magnetic Reference Laboratory's calibration tapes for analogue tape recorders. The title refers to one-thousand hertz (rendered 1000 hz), a measure used in audio recording describing a sine wave cycling 1,000 times per second. 

The album was named Rockfeedback magazine's record of the decade. Jehnny Beth of Savages-fame named the album one of her biggest influences, saying that it had made her "want to be a bassist" & inspired her ideas of recording music.

Track listing

Personnel
 Shellac:
 Steve Albini – guitar, vocals
 Todd Trainer – drums, vocals
 Bob Weston – bass, vocals
 Bill Skibbe – tape operator
 Rob Bochnik – tape operator
 Greg Norman – tape operator
 John Loder – mastering
 Steve Rooke – mastering
 Philip Baker Hall - introduction on "Prayer to God"

Charts
Album – Billboard (North America)

References

Shellac (band) albums
2000 albums
Touch and Go Records albums
Albums produced by Steve Albini
Albums produced by Bob Weston
Albums produced by Todd Trainer